Golovatenko is a Russian-language surname Головатенко. Notable people with the surname include:

Jekaterina Golovatenko (born 1979), Estonian former competitive figure skater
Nikolai Golovatenko (born 1963), Soviet former racing cyclist

Russian-language surnames